Ken McNicholl (27 November 1930 – 23 November 1997) was a New Zealand cricketer. He played in six first-class matches for Canterbury from 1952 to 1957.

See also
 List of Canterbury representative cricketers

References

External links
 

1930 births
1997 deaths
New Zealand cricketers
Canterbury cricketers